The Ju-jitsu competition at the World Games 2005 took place from July 21 to July 22, in Duisburg, Germany, at the Landschaftspark Nord, Kraftzentrale.

Schedule 
21.07.2005 – Men's and Women's Fighting System, Men's and Women's Duo System – Classic
22.07.2005 – Men's and Women's Fighting System, Mixed Duo System – Classic

European Ju-Jitsu

Fighting System

Men's events

Women's events

Duo System

Duo Classic events

Links

References

External links
Live results
Official results (PDF)

2005 World Games
2005